Tape Deck Mountain is an American shoegaze/indie rock band founded in 2008 by San Diego native, Travis Trevisan.  The band currently resides in Nashville, Tennessee. Pitchfork Media dubbed them 'dark surf' and Wild Honey Pie said they were 'brooding, shoegaze nirvana'.  Their song "Ghost Colony" was feature in Season 2 of Sons of Anarchy.
International Film Channel feature a live set of band performing live from San Diego, CA
http://www.ifc.com/2009/11/tape-deck-mountain  International Film Channel feature a live set of band performing original songs and Danzig cover.  http://www.ifc.com/2009/11/tape-deck-mountain The band contributed an exclusive song to Somewherecold Records' Various Artists compilation Resistance Compilation II: In Support of the ACLU, released on July 3, 2020.

Albums
Ghost (November 17, 2009 US / Lefse Records)
Sway (October 15, 2013 US/EUR - Nineteen98 / Mouca)

References

Musical groups established in 2008
American indie rock groups
American shoegaze musical groups
Somewherecold Records artists